Annunciation is a 1505-1510 oil on canvas painting by Andrea Previtali, produced for the high altar of the church of Santa Maria Annunziata in Meschio, now a district of Vittorio Veneto, where it is still on show. It was produced before the Bergamo-born artist returned to his birthplace. It is signed ANDREA BERGOMENSIS IOANIS BELLINI DISCIPLINUS PINXIT and shows marked influence from Previtali's teacher Giovanni Bellini.

History

Analysis

References

Bibliography
  Antonia Abbatista Finocchiaro, 'La pittura bergamasca nella prima decina del cinquecento', in La Rivista di Bergamo, 2001.
 

Previtali
Paintings by Andrea Previtali
Paintings in Veneto
1510 paintings
Vittorio Veneto